Alberto Munoz (born October 28, 1981) is a Venezuelan former soccer player who played for Tampa Bay Mutiny in the MLS.

Career statistics

Club

Notes

References

1981 births
Living people
Venezuelan footballers
Venezuelan expatriate footballers
Association football midfielders
Tampa Bay Mutiny players
Indiana Blast players
A-League (1995–2004) players
Major League Soccer players
USL Second Division players
Sportspeople from Maracaibo
21st-century Venezuelan people